Microsoft Indic Language Input Tool is a typing tool (Input Method Editor) for languages written in Indic scripts. It is a virtual keyboard which allows to type Indic text directly in any application without the hassle of copying and pasting. It is available for both, online and offline use. It was released in December 2009.

It works on the Dictionary-based Phonetic Transliteration approach. It means whatever you type in Latin characters, it matches that with its dictionary and transliterates it, it also gives suggestions for matching words.

See also

 Google transliteration
 Google IME
 Azhagi (software)

External links 
Download Microsoft Indic Language Input Tool
Microsoft ILIT Install Instruction (Hindi)

Indic Language Input Tool
Input method editor
Indic computing